Fade to Silence is an action survival game. Fade to Silence was released initially on Steam Early Access on December 14, 2017, with the full release on April 30, 2019.

Gameplay 
Players take control of protagonist character Ash, who is described as a "natural leader" tasked with facing "eldritch monsters and the elements in a post-apocalyptic environment blanketed in endless winter." Fade to Silence will allow the players to "construct, upgrade and defend" their refuges, as well as rescue and recruit followers, combating monsters and exploring a 10 km squared snowy hellscape. The game also offers the option to focus on building and defending a refuge in a bleak, monster-strewn open world.

Development 
Fade to Silence was announced at The Game Awards 2017 on December 2017. It will be a survival game set in a snow-covered forest, requiring the player to collect resources, build a refuge, and recruit others as followers to survive. The game entered early access on December 14, 2017, with plans for a full release in August 2018.

Reception
Fade to Silence received mixed reviews from critics. Many praised the base building and survival aspects, but were left disappointed by the story.

References

External links

2019 video games
Action-adventure games
Early access video games
Open-world video games
PlayStation 4 games
Xbox One games
Windows games
Video games developed in Germany
Unreal Engine games
Single-player video games
Black Forest games
THQ Nordic games